Theodora Bynon (born 1936) is a British linguist and Emeritus Professor of Historical Linguistics at SOAS University of London. She was a student of the German linguist Hans Krahe and studied the ergative case in languages such as Kurdish. She is known for her works on historical linguistics and wrote what is considered a seminal text in 1977.

Books
Historical Linguistics, Cambridge University Press, 1977
James and Theodora Bynon (eds.), Hamito-Semitica, London 1975
Masayoshi Shibatani & Theodora Bynon, Approaches to language typology, Clarendon Press, 1995.

References

1936 births
Living people
Linguists of English
Academics of SOAS University of London
Linguists from the United Kingdom